Marilise Neptune Rouzier (born 1945) is a Haitian writer, biologist and ethnobotanist. In addition to her publications, she also served as consultant to the Parc de Martissant botanical garden's collection of medicinal plants in Port-au-Prince.

Publications
 "Petit guide médicinal du jardin", World Bank (1997?).
 "Plantes médicinales d'Haïti : description, usages et propriétés"; Éditions Regain, 1998; Éditions de l'Université d'État d'Haïti, 2014.
 "La médecine traditionnelle familiale en Haïti : Enquête ethnobotanique dans la zone métropolitaine de Port-au-Prince";  Éditions de l'Université d'État d'Haïti, 2008.
 "Diabète et hypertension artérielle : Remèdes familiaux dans la région de Port-au-Prince";  Éditions de l'Université d'État d'Haïti, 2012.
 "Médecine familiale, point de jonction pour l’intégration de la médecine traditionnelle et de la médecine conventionnelle", Haiti Perspectives, v1 #3, December 2012

References

1945 births
Caribbean women
Ethnobotanists
Haitian scientists
Haitian women scientists
Living people

Women botanists